Bengt Norling (1925–2002) was a Swedish social democrat politician who held several government posts. He was the minister of communications (Transport) from 1969 and 1976 and the governor of Värmland from 1977 to 1990.

Biography
Norling was born in Malmö in 1925 and raised in Norrbotten. At 15 he began to work as a metal worker and then became a railway official in Vansbro. During this period he joined the Swedish Social Democratic Party in Vansbro. In 1956 he was named an ombudsman in the Railway Workers' Associations.

Norling was made the secretary of the Swedish Trade Union Confederation. He was appointed the minister of communications (Transport) to the first cabinet of Prime Minister Olof Palme on 14 October 1969. Norling remained in the post until 1976. He served as the governor of Värmland between 1977 and 1990.

Following his retirement Norling settled in Karlstad with his wife, Elizabeth. They had a son. He died at age 77 on 2 June 2002.

References

20th-century Swedish politicians
1925 births
2002 deaths
Politicians from Malmö
Swedish Ministers for Communications
Swedish Social Democratic Party politicians
Governors of Värmland County
Swedish trade unionists